The 2011 WNBA season is the 12th season for the Indiana Fever of the Women's National Basketball Association.

Transactions

WNBA Draft
The following are the Fever's selections in the 2011 WNBA Draft.

Transaction log
February 2: The Fever signed Tangela Smith.
February 4: The Fever re-signed Jessica Davenport and signed Shyra Ely to a training camp contract.
February 8: The Fever re-signed Joy Cheek.
February 14: The Fever signed Shannon Bobbitt to a training camp contract.
March 11: The Fever signed Aisha Mohammed and Abi Olajuwon to training camp contracts.
April 29: The Fever traded their second- and third-round picks in the 2012 Draft to the Seattle Storm and Washington Mystics, respectively, in exchange for Erin Phillips and a third-round pick in the 2012 Draft from Seattle.
May 1: The Fever waived Jori Davis.
May 5: The Fever waived Joy Cheek.
May 19: The Fever waived Aisha Mohammed.
May 30: The Fever waived Abi Olajuwon and Jene Morris.
June 1: The Fever waived Jessica Moore.

Trades

Personnel changes

Additions

Subtractions

Roster

Depth

Season standings

Schedule

Preseason

|- align="center" bgcolor="ffbbbb"
| 1 || May 24 || 1:00pm || @ Minnesota || 66–71 || Douglas (11) || Catchings (8) || January (7) || Concordia University  2,055 || 0–1
|- align="center" bgcolor="ffbbbb"
| 2 || May 31 || 7:00pm || Minnesota || 70–76 || Douglas (15) || Catchings, Douglas (5) || 3 players (2) || Conseco Fieldhouse  3,817 || 0–2
|-

Regular season

|- align="center" bgcolor="bbffbb"
| 1 || June 4 || 7:00pm || Chicago || FS-ICN100 || 65–57 || Douglas (19) || Catchings (9) || January (4) || Conseco Fieldhouse  8,024 || 1–0
|- align="center" bgcolor="ffbbbb"
| 2 || June 10 || 7:00pm || New York ||  || 80–81 || Douglas (27) || CatchingsDavenportSmith (6) || CatchingsPhillips (3) || Conseco Fieldhouse  7,703 || 1–1
|- align="center" bgcolor="bbffbb"
| 3 || June 11 || 7:00pm || @ New York || MSG || 86–80 || Catchings (19) || Davenport (8) || CatchingsDouglasPhillips (4) || Prudential Center  7,835 || 2–1
|- align="center" bgcolor="bbffbb"
| 4 || June 14 || 7:00pm || Tulsa || ESPN2 || 82–74 || Douglas (22) || CatchingsDavenportDouglas (7) || January (10) || Conseco Fieldhouse  6,024 || 3–1 
|- align="center" bgcolor="ffbbbb"
| 5 || June 17 || 10:00pm || @ Seattle ||  || 54–68 || Douglas (11) || Catchings (14) || January (3) || KeyArena  8,178 || 3–2 
|- align="center" bgcolor="ffbbbb"
| 6 || June 19 || 6:00pm || @ Phoenix ||  || 89–93 (OT) || Davenport (20) || Catchings (15) || BobbittJanuary (6) || US Airways Center  7,701 || 3–3 
|- align="center" bgcolor="bbffbb"
| 7 || June 21 || 7:00pm || @ Washington || CSN-MA || 89–80 || Zellous (21) || CatchingsDavenport (6) || January (9) || Verizon Center  7,980 || 4–3 
|- align="center" bgcolor="bbffbb"
| 8 || June 25 || 7:00pm || Connecticut || NBATVCSN-NE || 75–70 || Catchings (13) || Catchings (12) || Catchings (5) || Conseco Fieldhouse  7,100 || 5–3 
|- align="center" bgcolor="bbffbb"
| 9 || June 26 || 7:00pm || @ Minnesota || NBATVFS-N || 78–75 || Douglas (22) || Douglas (8) || January (4) || Target Center  7,117 || 6–3 
|- align="center" bgcolor="bbffbb"
| 10 || June 28 || 7:00pm || Phoenix ||  || 91–86 || Douglas (26) || Sutton-Brown (6) || Catchings (7) || Conseco Fieldhouse  6,625 || 7–3 
|-

|- align="center" bgcolor="bbffbb"
| 11 || July 5 || 7:00pm || Seattle || FS-I || 78–61 || Davenport (15) || Davenport (7) || Phillips (6) || Conseco Fieldhouse  6,525 || 8–3
|- align="center" bgcolor="bbffbb"
| 12 || July 9 || 7:00pm || Washington ||  || 68–57 || Phillips (14) || Catchings (7) || Catchings (4) || Conseco Fieldhouse  7,056 || 9–3 
|- align="center" bgcolor="bbffbb"
| 13 || July 13 || 1:00pm || Connecticut ||  || 90–78 || Douglas (20) || CatchingsPhillips (5) || Catchings (7) || Conseco Fieldhouse  9,045 || 10–3 
|- align="center" bgcolor="ffbbbb"
| 14 || July 15 || 7:00pm || Minnesota ||  || 70–80 || Catchings (22) || CatchingsDavenport (5) || Zellous (4) || Conseco Fieldhouse  7,538 || 10–4 
|- align="center" bgcolor="ffbbbb"
| 15 || July 17 || 5:00pm || @ Connecticut ||  || 71–76 || Catchings (18) || Catchings (15) || PhillipsPohlenSmith (4) || Mohegan Sun Arena  7,075 || 10–5 
|- align="center" bgcolor="ffbbbb"
| 16 || July 19 || 12:00pm || @ Atlanta || NBATVSSO || 74–84 || Catchings (22) || Catchings (8) || Catchings (6) || Philips Arena  7,645 || 10–6 
|- align="center" bgcolor="bbffbb"
| 17 || July 21 || 7:00pm || Chicago || NBATVFS-ICN100 || 77–63 || Davenport (20) || CatchingsDavenportDouglas (7) || Douglas (7) || Conseco Fieldhouse  8,050 || 11–6 
|-
| colspan="11" align="center" valign="middle" | All-Star break
|- align="center" bgcolor="bbffbb"
| 18 || July 28 || 7:30pm || @ Connecticut ||  || 69–58 || Catchings (16) || Davenport (10) || Bobbitt (5) || Mohegan Sun Arena  6,329 || 12–6 
|- align="center" bgcolor="bbffbb"
| 19 || July 29 || 7:00pm || @ Washington || NBATVCSN-MA || 61–59 || Catchings (16) || Catchings (9) || Catchings (5) || Verizon Center  11,587 || 13–6 
|- align="center" bgcolor="bbffbb"
| 20 || July 31 || 6:00pm || Los Angeles ||  || 98–63 || Davenport (16) || Catchings (11) || Catchings (6) || Conseco Fieldhouse  9,256 || 14–6 
|-

|- align="center" bgcolor="bbffbb"
| 21 || August 5 || 8:00pm || @ Tulsa ||  || 85–65 || Davenport (17) || Zellous (5) || Phillips (4) || BOK Center  5,013 || 15–6 
|- align="center" bgcolor="ffbbbb"
| 22 || August 7 || 6:00pm || @ Chicago || CN100 || 69–88 || Douglas (14) || Phillips (8) || Catchings (5) || Allstate Arena  5,794 || 15–7 
|- align="center" bgcolor="bbffbb"
| 23 || August 9 || 7:00pm || San Antonio ||  || 81–68 || Catchings (21) || Davenport (8) || CatchingsDouglas (3) || Conseco Fieldhouse  7,520 || 16–7 
|- align="center" bgcolor="bbffbb"
| 24 || August 13 || 7:00pm || New York || NBATV || 82–71 || Catchings (32) || Phillips (6) || Phillips (4) || Conseco Fieldhouse  9,237 || 17–7 
|- align="center" bgcolor="bbffbb"
| 25 || August 16 || 8:00pm || @ San Antonio ||  || 65–63 || Catchings (26) || Bobbitt (6) || CatchingsPohlenZellous (2) || AT&T Center  6,358 || 18–7 
|- align="center" bgcolor="ffbbbb"
| 26 || August 18 || 10:30pm || @ Los Angeles ||  || 70–75 || CatchingsPhillips (16) || Smith (9) || PhillipsSmith (5) || Staples Center  8,102 || 18–8 
|- align="center" bgcolor="bbffbb"
| 27 || August 21 || 6:00pm || Washington || NBATVFS-I || 83–51 || Douglas (15) || Catchings (8) || Catchings (5) || Conseco Fieldhouse  7,935 || 19–8
|- align="center" bgcolor="ffbbbb"
| 28 || August 27 || 7:00pm || Atlanta || NBATVFS-ISSO || 80–86 || Catchings (22) || Sutton-Brown (6) || Douglas (5) || Conseco Fieldhouse  9,242 || 19–9 
|- align="center" bgcolor="ffbbbb"
| 29 || August 30 || 7:30pm || @ Atlanta || SSO || 90–92 || Phillips (21) || Catchings (7) || Douglas (4) || Philips Arena  6,467 || 19–10 
|-

|- align="center" bgcolor="ffbbbb"
| 30 || September 2 || 7:30pm || @ Connecticut ||  || 55–83 || Douglas (12) || Catchings (8) || Catchings (5) || Mohegan Sun Arena  6,991 || 19–11 
|- align="center" bgcolor="bbffbb"
| 31 || September 4 || 6:00pm || @ Chicago || NBATVCN100 || 88–80 || CatchingsDouglas (17) || Catchings (7) || Catchings (6) || Allstate Arena  6,199 || 20–11 
|- align="center" bgcolor="bbffbb"
| 32 || September 7 || 7:00pm || Washington || NBATV || 87–69 || Douglas (21) || Catchings (10) || Douglas (5) || Conseco Fieldhouse  8,514 || 21–11
|- align="center" bgcolor="ffbbbb"
| 33 || September 9 || 7:00pm || @ New York || NBATVMSG+ || 75–83 || Douglas (17) || Catchings (6) || Bobbitt (7) || Prudential Center  8,015 || 21–12 
|- align="center" bgcolor="ffbbbb"
| 34 || September 11 || 5:00pm || Atlanta || NBATVFS-ISSO || 88–93 || Douglas (30) || Davenport (9) || Bobbitt (6) || Conseco Fieldhouse  11,521 || 21–13 
|-

| All games are viewable on WNBA LiveAccess or ESPN3.com

Postseason

|- align="center" bgcolor="bbffbb"
| 1 || September 15 || 8:00pm || New York || ESPN2 || 74–72 || Douglas (25) || Sutton-Brown (7) || BobbittPhillips (3) || Conseco Fieldhouse  7,608 || 1–0 
|- align="center" bgcolor="ffbbbb"
| 2 || September 17 || 4:00pm || @ New York || NBATVMSG || 72–87 || Douglas (20) || Catchings (9) || BobbittPhillips (4) || Prudential Center  8,508 || 1–1
|- align="center" bgcolor="bbffbb"
| 3 || September 19 || 8:00pm || New York || ESPN2 || 72–62 || Douglas (21) || Catchings (8) || Catchings (4) || Conseco Fieldhouse  7,368 || 2–1
|-

|- align="center" bgcolor="bbffbb"
| 1 || September 22 || 7:00pm || Atlanta || ESPN2 || 82–74 || Smith (25) || Catchings (13) || CatchingsDouglasZellous (3) || Conseco Fieldhouse  8,253 || 1–0  
|- align="center" bgcolor="ffbbbb"
| 2 || September 25 || 3:00pm || @ Atlanta || ESPN2 || 77–94 || Douglas (25) || Catchings (9) || Douglas (6) || Philips Arena  8,052 || 1–1
|- align="center" bgcolor="ffbbbb"
| 3 || September 27 || 8:00pm || Atlanta || ESPN2 || 67–83 || Douglas (16) || DouglasSutton-Brown (9) || CatchingsPhillips (3) || Conseco Fieldhouse  9,036 || 1–2
|-

Statistics

Regular season

Postseason

Awards and honors
Katie Douglas was named WNBA Eastern Conference Player of the Week for the week of June 3, 2011.
Tamika Catchings was named to the 2011 WNBA All-Star Team as a starter.
Katie Douglas was named to the 2011 WNBA All-Star Team as a starter.
Tamika Catchings was named to the All-Defensive First Team.
Katie Douglas was named to the All-Defensive Second Team.
Tamika Catchings was named to the All-WNBA First Team.
Tamika Catchings was named Most Valuable Player.

References

External links

Indiana Fever seasons
Indiana
Indiana Fever